Irfan Hussain was a senior cartoonist for the Indian magazine, Outlook, who was kidnapped and murdered in 1999. There have been no convictions in the case so far.

Kidnapping and murder

On 8 March 1999, after spending an evening at the Delhi Press club at Raisina Hill, Irfan Hussain called his wife to tell her that he would arrive at home in 15 minutes. He dropped off a colleague at Laxmibai Nagar. Then he went missing on the way to his home in Sahibabad. On 9 March, his wife, Munira Hussain, filed a missing person report. After three days, Paresh Nath, a cartoonist at The National Herald, received an anonymous phone call from someone claiming to be from the Shiv Sena, saying that Hussain had already been murdered; and that he and another Delhi cartoonist, Sudhir Tailang, would also be killed soon. Shiv Sena, a Hindu nationalist party, denied its involvement.

The body of Irfan Hussain was discovered on 13 March 1999 in a field in Ghazipur in east Delhi near the National Highway 24. By this time, Hussain had been missing for five days. He had been found strangled, his throat was slit, he had 28 stab wounds and his hands and feet were bound, indicating he was tortured. A colleague asked to identify the body could only do so by his shoes, due to disfigurement. His car and cellphone could not be found.

Investigation and arrests

In late March 1999, police claimed to have recovered a bag belonging to Hussain from Panipat. On 5 December 1999, the missing car's stereo was found from a dealer. The car was recovered in Anantnag. On 14 December, the police arrested five accused from a metropolitan court, where they were under trial for auto theft.

Trial
On 8 February 2001, the charges were filed against the five for kidnapping with the intent to murder, murder and group liability. On 1 June 2001, a sixth accused, a juvenile, was arrested. On 23 July 2001, the Additional Sessions Judge court began hearing the evidence of the prosecution.

On 12 September 2005, the juvenile accused petitioned the court for his case to be transferred to a juvenile court, and on 19 September it was accepted.

On 3 January 2006, the court finished the prosecution's case and about 60 witnesses' statements were recorded. On 30 January, the court began hearing the accused's case where they pleaded innocence. On 4 February, the final arguments began and on 27 February they were concluded.

On 28 February, the Additional Sessions Judge Talwant Singh gave the verdict that the evidence against the accused was circumstantial and they could not be linked to the crimes. They were acquitted. On 31 March, the written order was given.

Aftermath
The prosecution decided not to challenge the verdict. Hussain's father, Mansoor Bhai, gave permission to the Outlook magazine editor, Vinod Mehta, to file an appeal in the Delhi High Court. On 7 April 2006, Mehta said that the magazine's lawyers would file an appeal for a re-investigation.

See also
 List of journalists killed in India

References

External links
 
 

Assassinated Indian journalists
Indian cartoonists
1999 deaths
1964 births